Milton Vaughn Backman Jr. (June 11, 1927 – February 6, 2016) was a historian of American religions with particular emphasis on the early history of the Latter Day Saint movement.

Biography 

Backman was a professor of church history at Brigham Young University. Following his retirement, he briefly taught at the BYU-affiliated Joseph Smith Academy.

Backman was a member of the Church of Jesus Christ of Latter-day Saints (LDS Church) and served in various positions in the church, often related to teaching and welfare. He served as a member of a bishopric and on a stake high council. As a young man, Backman served as a missionary for the LDS Church in South Africa. Backman died on February 6, 2016, at the age of 88.

Writings 

The Heavens Resound: A History of the Latter-day Saints in Ohio, 1830-1838
American Religions and the Rise of Mormonism
Joseph Smith's First Vision: The First Vision in its Historical Context
Christian Churches of America: Origins and Beliefs 
Eyewitness Accounts of the Restoration
Edited
 Regional Studies in Latter-day Saint History: New York with Larry C. Porter and Susan Easton Black.

Backman also compiled a collection of diaries and biographies of people who knew Joseph Smith with the assistance of Keith W. Perkins.

Notes

References
http://www.amazon.com/s?ie=UTF8&search-type=ss&index=books&field-author=Milton%20V.%20Backman&page=1
Ensign, January 1989, p. 16

External links 
 

1927 births
2016 deaths
20th-century Mormon missionaries
American Latter Day Saint writers
American Mormon missionaries in South Africa
American historians of religion
American male non-fiction writers
Brigham Young University faculty
Historians of the Latter Day Saint movement
Latter Day Saints from Utah